The Du Show is a 34-story,  residential skyscraper completed in 2013 and located in Taichung's 7th Redevelopment Zone, Xitun District, Taichung, Taiwan. As of March 2021, the building is the 35th tallest in Taichung. The building was constructed under strict requirements of preventing damage caused by earthquakes and typhoons common in Taiwan.

See also 
 List of tallest buildings in Taiwan
 List of tallest buildings in Taichung
 Taichung's 7th Redevelopment Zone

References

2013 establishments in Taiwan
Residential skyscrapers in Taiwan
Skyscrapers in Taichung
Taichung's 7th Redevelopment Zone
Apartment buildings in Taiwan
Residential buildings completed in 2013